Vyatsky (masculine), Vyatskaya (feminine), or Vyatskoye (neuter) may refer to:
Vyatskoye, Astrakhan Oblast, a village (selo) in Astrakhan Oblast, Russia
Vyatskoye, Khabarovsk Krai, a village in Khabarovsk Krai, Russia
Vyatskoye, Mari El Republic, a village (selo) in the Mari El Republic, Russia
Vyatskoye, Udmurt Republic, a village (selo) in the Udmurt Republic, Russia
Vyatskoye, Yaroslavl Oblast, a village (selo) in Yaroslavl Oblast, Russia